Judith B. Sheerer (born November 17, 1940) is a former member of the Ohio General Assembly, serving in both the Ohio House of Representatives and the Ohio Senate from 1983 to 1998.  She was originally elected to the Ohio House in 1983, succeeding Matt Hatchadorian.  By her fifth term, Sheerer was serving as majority whip of the House. In 1992, when Senator Eric Fingerhut was elected to the United States Congress, Senate Democrats appointed Sheerer to his vacant seat. Reelected to her own term in 1994, she opted to not run again in 1998, and was succeeded by her predecessor, Eric Fingerhut.  She has since served as a member of the Ohio Elections Commission.

External links
Profile on the Ohio Ladies' Gallery website

References

Democratic Party Ohio state senators
Women state legislators in Ohio
Living people
1940 births
20th-century American politicians
20th-century American women politicians
21st-century American women